Christopher Michael Stuckmann (born April 15, 1988) is an American filmmaker, YouTuber, author, and film critic.

As one of the most popular film critics on YouTube, Stuckmann has over 2 million subscribers and over 708 million views on the platform as of February 2023. On review aggregation website Rotten Tomatoes he is an approved critic and a member of the Critics Choice Association.

In mid-2021, it was announced that Stuckmann had signed to write and direct his full feature debut Shelby Oaks with Paper Street Pictures and producer Aaron B. Koontz.

Early life
Stuckmann was born in Boston Heights, Ohio, growing up with two older sisters. Stuckmann is partly of German descent. He took an interest in film criticism from a young age, writing brief reviews of films as early as age fourteen. His primary inspiration among professional film critics was Roger Ebert, particularly the television-program Siskel & Ebert & the Movies which Ebert co-hosted with Gene Siskel. He writes that by watching these reviews, he "discovered the idea of a debate on a film, but a respectful one".

Stuckmann cites his experience watching Signs in theaters as a child as his primary inspiration for becoming a filmmaker. Filmmakers Stuckmann has cited as having heavily influenced him include George Lucas, Steven Spielberg, M. Night Shyamalan, and Christopher Nolan. Throughout high school, Stuckmann wrote and directed numerous homemade movies and short films with friends and family.

Career

Beginnings and YouTube success
He began publishing YouTube reviews of current films in his twenties and published his first film review in 2009. His reviews initially began under a short-form series titled Quick Movie Reviews. When he began publishing video reviews, there was only a small group of other video bloggers reviewing films on YouTube. He has also expanded into reviewing television shows, anime, and video games. His reviews are generally spoiler-free; however, he will occasionally release additional spoiler reviews for movies he feels would benefit from further, in-depth explanation.

He published his first book, The Film Buff’s Bucket List: The 50 Movies of the 2000s to See Before You Die, in 2016. A year later, he directed and wrote the short film Auditorium 6. In April 2018, Stuckmann published his second book titled Anime-Impact: The Movies and Shows that changed the World of Japanese Animation.

Stuckmann has become among the most popular film critics on the website, having a following of over 2.02 million subscribers as of February 2023. Stewart Fletcher of Moviepilot ranked Stuckmann's YouTube channel as the number one channel that movie fans should subscribe to, citing Stuckmann's passionate and coherently written reviews as the reason.

In a July 2021 video, he announced that he would be minimizing his efforts on doing film criticism videos for a while to focus on his upcoming film, discarding classification grades on his movie reviews and shifting towards discussion/analytic videos for movies he wants to draw attention and support to, as well as informative videos tailored toward people seeking information on making films.

Film projects

On July 6, 2021, it was announced that Stuckmann had recently signed with Gotham Group with multiple horror-scripts in the works. His full-length directorial debut, the horror-film Shelby Oaks, was planned to enter principal photography in late 2021 in Stuckmann's native Ohio. Stuckmann announced  that filming was pushed back to 2022, due to insufficient funds and a potential strike between the International Alliance of Theatrical Stage Employees (IATSE) and the Alliance of Motion Picture and Television Producers (AMPTP). He also announced that they would be launching a Kickstarter fundraising project for the film so as to give him the creative leeway to better execute his vision. The Kickstarter, which was launched in March 2022, quickly became the most-funded horror film on the site mere weeks after launch, while also surpassing the film's initial $250,000 goal. The final fundraising campaign ended on March 27, with $1,390,845 raised.

Personal life
Stuckmann has been married to his wife Samantha Elizabeth, who goes by Sam Liz, since 2014. He is also a former Jehovah's Witness and in January 2021 he uploaded a video where he detailed his negative experiences with the religion, and how he eventually left the faith in his early twenties to pursue filmmaking. In the same video, he also publicly came out as pansexual. On November 21, 2021, Stuckmann announced that Liz had given birth to twin boys, Fox and Grayson, on July 7, 2021. In the video, Liz spoke about her health issues and difficulties with fertility treatments.

Filmography

Feature films

Short films

YouTube

Bibliography
 The Film Buff's Bucket List: The 50 Movies of the 2000s to See Before You Die (2016)
 Anime Impact: The Movies and Shows that Changed the World of Japanese Animation (2018)

References

External links
 
 Chris Stuckmann at Rotten Tomatoes
 Chris Stuckmann at YouTube

1988 births
20th-century American LGBT people
21st-century American non-fiction writers
21st-century American LGBT people
American film critics
American people of German descent
American YouTubers
Channel Awesome
Critics of Jehovah's Witnesses
Film directors from Ohio
Former Jehovah's Witnesses
American LGBT entertainers
LGBT people from Ohio
American LGBT writers
LGBT YouTubers
Living people
Pansexual entertainers
Pansexual men
Screenwriters from Ohio
Writers from Akron, Ohio
YouTube channels launched in 2011
YouTube critics and reviewers
YouTube filmmakers